Jacqueline Mary Osborne (née Jossa) (born 29 October 1992) is an English actress and television presenter. She is known for portraying Lauren Branning in the BBC soap opera EastEnders from 2010 to 2022, and winning the nineteenth series of the ITV series I'm a Celebrity... Get Me Out of Here! in 2019. She was a winner of The Masked Singer Live in April 2022 at Wembley Arena, appearing as Baby Dino.

Early life
Jossa was born on 29 October 1992 in Bexley. She trained at D&B Theatre School in Bromley, followed by the Royal Academy of Music in London. She has one older sister, Katrina, and two older brothers who died in infancy. She is the cousin of former EastEnders actress Megan Jossa.

Career
Jossa was cast in EastEnders in 2010 as Lauren Branning, Jossa was reportedly "excited" to join the show, saying she has always been a fan. Her first appearance was on 27 September 2010. Jossa also appeared in Lauren's internet spin-off series, Lauren's Diaries, with two series in 2010 and 2011.
In September 2017, it was revealed that Jossa would be leaving EastEnders after seven years alongside on-screen sister, Lorna Fitzgerald. Their exit was a decision made by the new temporary producer John Yorke. A spokesperson for the soap said, "We can confirm that Jacqueline and Lorna will be leaving EastEnders. They have both been wonderful to work with and we wish them all the best for the future". Jossa's final scenes aired on 16 February 2018.

In 2013, she appeared as a panellist on the BBC Three comedy panel show Sweat the Small Stuff.

In November 2019, Jossa was a contestant on the nineteenth series of the ITV reality TV show I'm a Celebrity...Get Me Out of Here!. She subsequently won the show, and was crowned 'Queen of the Jungle'.

Jacqueline's current role includes advertising products on social media as an "influencer". In June 2022 the Advertising Standards Agency publicly reprimanded her for not disclosing financial connections with advertisers and she remains (at time of writing) on their list of "Non-compliant social media influencers".

Personal life
On 24 June 2017, Jossa married television personality Dan Osborne. They have two daughters; Ella and Mia. Her cousin, Ciara Watling, is a Northern Ireland international footballer.

Filmography

Awards and nominations
Jossa was nominated in the category of "Best Soap Newcomer" at the 2011 TV Choice Awards. On 25 January 2012 Jossa won "Best Newcomer" at the National Television Awards. She was shortlisted in the category "Sexiest Female" in the British Soap Awards in 2012, 2013 and 2014 but lost to Michelle Keegan (Tina McIntyre) of Coronation Street. In 2013, Jossa was nominated for Best Actress at the Inside Soap Awards which she later won. She was also nominated for Best Storyline in 2013 for "Lauren's struggle with alcohol", and for ‘Sexiest Female’ in four consecutive years from 2013 to 2016.

References

External links

Living people
1992 births
People from Bexley
Actresses from London
English soap opera actresses
I'm a Celebrity...Get Me Out of Here! (British TV series) winners